The 1963 AFL Championship Game was the fourth American Football League (AFL) title game. The Western Division champion San Diego Chargers won 51–10 over the Eastern Division champion Boston Patriots. The Chargers' Keith Lincoln was named the game's most valuable player (MVP).

At the end of the regular season, the Chargers (11–3) won the Western Division for the third time in the four-year existence of the AFL. In the Eastern Division, the Patriots and the Buffalo Bills had identical 7–6–1 records, which required a tiebreaker playoff game on December 28 in Buffalo.

Eastern Division playoff
In their final regular season games on Saturday, December 14, Boston lost and Buffalo won to draw even in the standings. Three-time division winner Houston (6–6) controlled their own destiny, but lost the next day and were eliminated. Buffalo and Boston had two weeks to prepare for the playoff, as their bye weeks were postponed from November 24 to December 22, due to the assassination of President Kennedy.

The game was played on Saturday, December 28, as the following day was the NFL championship game. On a slippery field at War Memorial Stadium in Buffalo with an inch of snow, visiting Boston led 16–0 at halftime and won 26–8. Quarterback Babe Parilli threw a touchdown pass in each half to fullback Larry Garron and Gino Cappelletti made four field goals for the Patriots. The Bills' sole score was a 93-yard touchdown pass play in the third quarter with a two-point conversion, which cut the lead to eight points.

Surface: Natural grass

Championship Game
Idle during the week of Eastern Division playoff, well-rested San Diego was a touchdown favorite at home to win the AFL. Fullback Keith Lincoln performed tremendously and led the Chargers to a 51–10 rout of Boston. Named the game's MVP, he rushed for 206 yards on 13 carries, led the team with 123 yards in receiving, and completed a pass for 20 yards.

The game was not a sellout; the attendance of 30,127 was several thousand under Balboa Stadium's capacity.

The Chargers' championship win  is noted for being the only major sports title for the city of San Diego, the longest drought for a major American city. The Chargers played in San Diego through 2016, then returned to Los Angeles in 2017. The Patriots' first league championship came in the 2001 season in Super Bowl XXXVI.

Starting lineups

Players' shares
The attendance in San Diego was nearly 8,000 lower than the previous year's game in Houston, but the players' shares were up slightly with increased television revenue. The winning Chargers players each made around $2,500, while the Patriots received about $1,700 each. These shares were less than half of those for the NFL title game in 1963, at approximately $6,000 and $4,200 each.

See also
 1963 AFL season
 AFL Championship Games
 1963 NFL Championship Game

References

1963
Boston Patriots postseason
San Diego Chargers postseason
Playoffs
American football in San Diego
American Football League Championship Game
American Football League Championship Game